Mararaba is a town in Nasarawa State, central Nigeria. It is a district of Karu Local Government Area, Nasarawa State and is among the towns that make up the Karu urban area, a conurbation of towns stretching to Nigeria's Federal Capital Territory.
Its neighbouring towns are:

Ado
Nyanya
New Nyanya
Masaka
New Karu and Kurunduma are villages that grew, as a result of the rapid growth and expansion of administrative and economic activities of Abuja into neighbouring towns, coupled with the evacuation of tens of thousands of people from Abuja by the Federal Capital Territory (Nigeria) (FCT) administration. Mararaba is believed to be one of the most densely populated suburbs around the Nigerian capital city Abuja and this contributes to its reputation as having one of the busiest road channels with traffic jams stretching as much as 11 kilometres from the popular A.Y.A. junction during rush hours. Mararaba also has various markets e.g. mararab market etc.
The indigenes of Maraba are the Gbagyi people.

Economy 
Maraba is a densely populated area, and this population has directly led to a massive increase in commercial activities. There are 3 major markets in Maraba which are Aso-Road Market, Fruit/Orange Market and Muhammadu Buhari International Market. Maraba generates the most revenue for Nasarawa state, and it is referred to as a diverse-town because of the high numbers of people from the different part of Nigeria living here.

References 

Populated places in Nasarawa State
Populated places in the Federal Capital Territory (Nigeria)